Clive Banton (born 20 January 1969) is a Jamaican cricketer. He played in two first-class and two List A matches for the Jamaican cricket team from 1988 to 1990.

See also
 List of Jamaican representative cricketers

References

External links
 

1969 births
Living people
Jamaican cricketers
Jamaica cricketers
Place of birth missing (living people)